Kenbridge is a town in Lunenburg County, Virginia, United States. The population was 1,257 at the 2010 census. It is in a tobacco farming area. The area is home to noted folk artist Eldridge Bagley.

Geography
Kenbridge is located at  (36.962805, -78.126896).

According to the United States Census Bureau, the town has a total area of 2.0 square miles (5.3 km²), all of it land.

Brickland, the Fifth Avenue Historic District, Flat Rock, and the Jones Farm are listed on the National Register of Historic Places.

Demographics

At the 2000 census there were 1,253 people, 529 households, and 320 families living in the town. The population density was 614.6 people per square mile (237.1/km²). There were 579 housing units at an average density of 284.0 per square mile (109.6/km²).  The racial makeup of the town was 51.56% White, 44.93% African American, 0.40% Asian, 1.28% from other races, and 1.84% from two or more races. Hispanic or Latino of any race were 4.39%.

Of the 529 households 20.8% had children under the age of 18 living with them, 38.9% were married couples living together, 15.9% had a female householder with no husband present, and 39.5% were non-families. 35.7% of households were one person and 19.1% were one person aged 65 or older. The average household size was 2.24 and the average family size was 2.83.

The age distribution was 21.9% under the age of 18, 9.8% from 18 to 24, 23.0% from 25 to 44, 25.9% from 45 to 64, and 19.4% 65 or older. The median age was 41 years. For every 100 females there were 101.1 males. For every 100 females age 18 and over, there were 99.0 males.

The median income for a household in the town was $26,818, and the median family income  was $38,929. Males had a median income of $22,083 versus $18,456 for females. The per capita income for the town was $15,386. About 11.4% of families and 18.8% of the population were below the poverty line, including 27.8% of those under age 18 and 18.7% of those age 65 or over.

References

Towns in Lunenburg County, Virginia